Ransomes Sports Pavilion (formerly Ransomes and Reavell Sports Club Ground) is a cricket ground in Ipswich, Suffolk.  The first recorded match on the ground was in 1972, Suffolk played Hertfordshire in the grounds first Minor Counties Championship match.  From 1972 to present, the ground has hosted 48 Minor Counties Championship matches, including the rain-affected 2005 final between Suffolk and Cheshire in 2005, which was drawn. and 2 MCCA Knockout Trophy matches.

The ground has also hosted a single List-A match which saw Minor Counties East play Middlesex in the 1978 Benson and Hedges Cup.

The ground is the home of St Margaret's Cricket Club and Ransomes Sports Football Club.

References

External links
Ransomes and Reavell Sports Club Ground on CricketArchive
Ransomes and Reavell Sports Club Ground on Cricinfo

Cricket grounds in Suffolk
Football venues in Suffolk
Football venues in England
Sports venues in Ipswich
Suffolk County Cricket Club
Sports venues completed in 1972